Colin Park (9 February 1944 – 23 November 2007) was a Canadian sailor. He won the ICSA Coed Dinghy National Championship with the University of British Columbia sailing team in 1964, and competed in the 470 event at the 1976 Summer Olympics.

References

External links
 

1944 births
2007 deaths
Canadian male sailors (sport)
Olympic sailors of Canada
Sailors at the 1976 Summer Olympics – 470
Sportspeople from Vancouver
UBC Thunderbirds sailors